Frans Dhia Jirjis Haddad (born 14 July 1993), known as Frans Putros, is a professional footballer who plays as a right back or a centre back for Thai club Port and the Iraq national team.

Born in Denmark, Putros is of Assyrian ethnicity from Iraq; he represented his native country internationally at youth level, before switching allegiance to Iraq, making his debut in 2018.

Club career
Putros began his youth career at IK Skovbakken, and was picked up by AGF in 2004, where he played a number of years in the youth and reserve teams for the club. He made his Danish Superliga debut on 16 November 2012, playing the full 90 minutes in a match against FC Nordsjælland.

In fall 2013, Putros was loaned to Silkeborg IF, where he was reunited with the former AGF assistant coach Jesper Sørensen, who had become the head coach of Silkeborg IF. After a successful stay in Silkeborg, Putros signed a permanent contract at the end of 2013. Putros joined Fredericia in 2015; he decided to run out his contract at the end of 2017 to sign a two-year deal with Hobro IK.

Putros joined Hobro IK in August 2017. He left the club at the end of 2019, where his contract expired. On 11 January 2020, he signed a two-and-a-half-year contract with Viborg FF.

International career
Putros was born in Denmark and is of Assyrian ethnicity from Iraq. Putros made his debut for the Iraq national team in a friendly 3–0 win over Palestine on 4 August 2018. He was part of the 2019 AFC Asian Cup squad.

Honours
Viborg
 Danish 1st Division: 2020–21

See also
 List of Iraq international footballers

References

External links 
 
 Danish national team profile 
 Danish Superliga stats 

1993 births
Living people
Footballers from Aarhus
Iraqi footballers
Danish men's footballers
Danish people of Iraqi descent
Danish people of Assyrian descent
People of Iraqi-Assyrian descent
Iraqi Assyrian people
Assyrian sportspeople
Association football defenders
Association football midfielders
Aarhus Gymnastikforening players
Silkeborg IF players
FC Fredericia players
Hobro IK players
Viborg FF players
Danish Superliga players
Danish 1st Division players
Denmark youth international footballers
Denmark under-21 international footballers
Frans Putros
Frans Putros
Iraq international footballers
2019 AFC Asian Cup players
Iraqi expatriate footballers
Expatriate footballers in Thailand